Garypus californicus is a species of pseudoscorpion in the family Garypidae.

References

Further reading

 

Garypoidea
Articles created by Qbugbot
Animals described in 1909